Allium dictuon is a species of wild onion known by the common name Blue Mountain onion. It is native to a small section of the Blue Mountains straddling the border between southeastern Washington and northeastern Oregon in the United States. It grows in Columbia, Garfield and Walla Walla Counties in Washington, plus Umatilla and Wallowa Counties in Oregon.

Allium dictuon grows from bulbs connected by rhizomes. It produces two or three leaves each up to 28 centimeters in length. The scape is 20 to 40 centimeters tall and bears an umbel of up to 25 flowers. The bell-shaped flowers are bright pink or purplish and each is 1.1 to 1.6 centimeters long. Blooming occurs in June and July.

Allium dictuon grows in dry, open, rocky habitat. The vegetation in the area is dominated by bluebunch wheatgrass (Pseudoroegneria spicata ssp. spicata).

The total population has been estimated to be between 200 and 500 individuals.

References

External links
USDA Plants Profile

dictuon
Flora of Oregon
Flora of Washington (state)
Plants described in 1937
Onions